The Barreiro/Anhemas Sustainable Development Reserve  is a sustainable development reserve in the state of São Paulo, Brazil.

Location

The Barreiro/Anhemas Sustainable Development Reserve  is in the municipality of Barra do Turvo, São Paulo.
The reserve is in the catchment area of the Turvo River, and lies on its right bank.
It includes large areas of pasture, and areas with new types of use such as agroforestry.
It supports several traditional families who were in the area before the Jacupiranga State Park was created, and did not move.

History

The Barreiro/Anhemas Sustainable Development Reserve was created by state law 12.810 of 21 February 2008.
This law broke up the old Jacupiranga State Park and created the Jacupiranga Mosaic with 14 conservation units.
The reserve is administered by the state forest foundation (Fundação para Conservação e a Produção Florestal do Estado de São Paulo).
As of 2016 it supported 176 families.

Notes

Sources

 
Sustainable development reserves of Brazil
Protected areas of São Paulo (state)
Protected areas of the Atlantic Forest
Environment of São Paulo (state)
Protected areas established in 2008
2008 establishments in Brazil